Treme is an American television drama series created by David Simon and Eric Overmyer. It premiered on HBO on April 11, 2010. The series follows the interconnected lives of a group of New Orleanians in the wake of Hurricane Katrina. Episode titles are primarily taken from a blues or jazz song. The series concluded on December 29, 2013, after four seasons and 36 episodes.

Series overview

Episodes

Season 1 (2010)

Season 2 (2011)

Season 3 (2012)

Season 4 (2013)

Ratings

References

External links
 
 

Lists of American drama television series episodes